Godyris cleomella is a species of butterfly of the family Nymphalidae. It is found in Bolivia and Peru.

References

Butterflies described in 1874
Ithomiini
Nymphalidae of South America
Taxa named by William Chapman Hewitson